Jan Becker (née Turner; 12 November 1944) is an Australian former swimmer. She competed in two events at the 1964 Summer Olympics.

References

External links
 

1944 births
Living people
Australian female butterfly swimmers
Australian female freestyle swimmers
Olympic swimmers of Australia
Swimmers at the 1964 Summer Olympics
Place of birth missing (living people)
20th-century Australian women